Premier Hockey League (PHL) was a professional field hockey league competition for clubs in the top division of the Indian hockey system. There were seven teams in the PHL. The competition was held every year from 2005 until 2008.

History

The competition conceptualized by Anurag Dahiya of ESPN Star Sports was created and promoted in partnership with Leisure Sports Management (LSM) and sanctioned by Indian Hockey Federation (IHF). It was first played in 2005 involving 5 teams with active support from sports channel ESPN India. First season had two tiers division 1 and division 2 but from 2007 season onwards division 2 was scrapped. Except team winning 2006 division 2 championship rest all teams in division 2 were scrapped. The competition was disbanded in 2008.

The 5 inaugural members of the new Premier Hockey League in 2005 were   Bangalore Hi-Fliers, Chennai Veerans, Hyderabad Sultans, Maratha Warriors and Sher-e-Jalandhar.

Competition

Format
Regular season of PHL runs between December and January. Since the inaugural season, the format has varied regularly. According to the last format, each team plays each other once in a single round robin format (21 matches) in the regular league season, then the top four play the semifinals (1 vs. 4 and 2 vs. 3) followed by the finals, adopting a best of three format, for the top 2 teams. There are a total of 26 matches for each session.

During a PHL match, points that contribute to team standings can be earned in the following ways:
 Result in regulation time
 3 points to the winner 
 0 point to the loser 
 Result after extra time
 2 points to the winner 
 1 point to the loser

In case of no winner has been decided after completion of a match and two periods of extra time, the winner of the match will be determined by a shoot-out competition.

New Features
The fundamental aberration from the format of normal hockey games is the number of sessions. A normal 70-minute hockey game includes two sessions, each of 35 minutes each. The PHL has four sessions each of 17.5 minutes. This format is tailor-made to include more advertising time in order to generate funds. Teams are allowed to take time-outs to chalk out new strategies during the course of the game.

If the match is deadlocked after full-time, the number of players of each team is gradually reduced till a result is obtained. A win within full-time fetches three points, whereas a win after full-time fetches two points to the winning team and one to the losing team. Each team is also allowed to field up to five international players.

In addition, another feature of the PHL for the year 2007, has been the innovative penalty shootout competition, modelled similar to the ice hockey penalty shootout. Each team will have five penalty shoot outs each where 5 players will play a one-on-one with the goal keeper of the opponent team. Each player will start with the ball on the 25 yard line and when the umpire blows the whistle player will have maximum of 8 secs to score a goal with only the goal keeper defending the goal. The player can take as many shots possible within the stipulated 8 secs.

Another interesting feature of PHL is timeouts, similar to basketball and volleyball. Each team will be allowed 2 x 120 second timeouts per team in regulation time. These timeouts will be mandatory and have to be taken once in each half of play. There will be a warning from the bench 5 minutes before the end of the second/fourth quarter if the team has still not availed of the mandatory timeout. 2 minutes from the end of the second/fourth quarter the timeout will be imposed by the technical bench if the team has still not availed of it.

In addition, each team will also be allowed 1 x 2 minute timeout which is not mandatory and could be taken at any point in time during the regulation time.

Players

A team shall consist of maximum of 18 (eighteen) players to be registered with PHDPL. 
Out of the above 18, maximum of 3 players can be of foreign origin. At any given point of time minimum 2 players of foreign origin shall be within the field of play during the course of a game. All eighteen players in a team have to be registered with the PHDPL and need to submit their identity cards before the start of the league qualifying for playing in a team. All Indian players currently employed have to be taken on lien for the duration of the league and then be registered with PHDPL. All the foreign players must obtain international transfer certificates from their respective countries and or clubs before signing up with the team and PHDPL.

International Players

There are a number of players from countries other than India, who have been contracted to play in the league.

Results

 2005 Hyderabad Sultans
Introduction of play offs from 2006 season.
 2006 Bangalore Lions 
 Chandigarh Dynamos finished 1st in the league table.
 2007 Orissa Steelers 
 Orissa Steelers also finished 1st in the league table.
 2008 Bangalore Hi-fliers 
 Chandigarh Dynamos finished 1st in the league table.

Impact and legacy
At the time of launch, many in the Indian Hockey circles were delighted to have hockey glamorized with the intention of reviving the flagging sport. Experts accused the Indian Hockey Federation of being too lethargic and bureaucratic in popularizing the sport. Hockey players of the likes of Sohail Abbas playing for an Indian city club excited a number of youngsters and drew them towards the game of Hockey. Critics argued that traditional hockey bastions such as Kodagu (Coorg), Jharkhand, Odisha and parts of Punjab were ignored and the organizers stated that in due course of time more teams would be included.

PHL did gain some ground in popular culture. Famously, in a scene in the hit Bollywood movie, Chak De! India, a character could be spotted wearing a PHL fan jersey. The league also had a long-lasting impact on the sport of field hockey globally, and commercial leagues in other sports that followed PHL in India. In field hockey, the biggest shift was the move away from 2 halves of 35 minutes each to 4 quarters of 17.5 minutes each. This measure, originally pioneered by PHL as a means of quickening the pace of the game, as well as to increase TV advertising time, has survived to this day. PHL was the first sports league in India with a strong commercial focus, tapping into regional / franchise teams as a means to driving fan engagement. This served as a template for later sports leagues including the IPL.

However, after 4 successful seasons, the Premier Hockey League ceased to exist. It has now made way to another similar formatted tournament, the Hockey India League.

See also
 World Series Hockey
 Hockey India League
 Hockey in India
 Indian National Hockey Team (Men)
 Indian National Hockey Team (Women)
 Premier Hockey League (South Africa)

References

External links 
 Official Website
 PHL 2007-08
 Premier Hockey League on SPORT195

 
Field hockey leagues in India
Professional sports leagues in India
Sports leagues in India
Defunct sports leagues in India
Sport in India